The Memory of Love is a 2010 novel by Aminatta Forna about the experiences of three men in Sierra Leone. In 2022, it was included on the "Big Jubilee Read" list of 70 books by Commonwealth authors, selected to celebrate the Platinum Jubilee of Elizabeth II.

Reception
Maaza Mengiste wrote in The New York Times: "Forna's first work of fiction, 'Ancestor Stones,' was an accomplished collection of interconnected stories. 'The Memory of Love,' equally layered, gives us a stronger, more nuanced voice, a writer more willing to take risks with plot and character. ... She forces us to see past bland categorizations like 'postcolonial African literature,' showing that the world we inhabit reaches beyond borders and ripples out through generations. She reminds us that what matters most is that which keeps us grounded in the place of our choosing. And she writes to expose what remains after all the noise has faded: at the core of this novel is the brave and beating heart, at once vulnerable and determined, unwilling to let go of all it has ever loved." 
The Guardian reviewer found it "an ambitious and deeply researched novel".

The Memory of Love has also been reviewed by Booklist, BookPage Reviews, Publishers Weekly, Kirkus Reviews, The Daily Telegraph, and The Spectator.

Awards
2011: Commonwealth Writers' Prize: Best Book - winner
2011: Warwick Prize - shortlist
2011: Women's Prize for Fiction - shortlist
2012: International Dublin Literary Award - shortlist

References

External links
Library holdings of The Memory of Love

2010 British novels
Novels set in Sierra Leone
History of Sierra Leone
Bloomsbury Publishing books